The County of Santa Clara Health System is the public healthcare system of Santa Clara County, California. Valley Medical Center, in San Jose, is the flagship hospital of the system. It comprises county-owned hospitals, clinics, health-related county agencies, and a health insurance plan.

History
The Santa Clara Valley Health and Hospital System was established in 1993. It became the Santa Clara County Health System in March 2019 after the county acquired O'Connor Hospital and Saint Louise Regional Hospital from Verity Health System to prevent the hospitals' closure.

Facilities

Hospitals

Valley Health Centers

Agencies and programs
 Santa Clara County Behavioral Health Services Department
 Santa Clara County Public Health Department
 Santa Clara County Emergency Medical Services Agency
 Santa Clara County Custody Health Services Department
 Valley Health Plan, a Covered California participating insurance provider

See also
 List of hospitals in San Jose, California

References

External links

 

Health System
Healthcare in the San Francisco Bay Area
1993 establishments in California
Government agencies established in 1993
Health departments in California